is a mountain located in the town of Yoshino in Yoshino District, Nara Prefecture, Japan that is a major religious and literary site. It is renowned for its cherry blossoms and attracts many visitors every spring, when the trees are in blossom. In 2004, Mount Yoshino was designated as part of a UNESCO World Heritage Site under the name Sacred Sites and Pilgrimage Routes in the Kii Mountain Range.

Mount Yoshino is famous for having more than 30,000 sakura flowering cherry trees. These trees have inspired Japanese waka poetry and folk songs for centuries, including a waka in the 10th century poetry compilation Kokin Wakashū. Yoshino is also the subject of several poems in the Ogura Hyakunin Isshu.  The 12th century CE Japanese Buddhist poet Saigyō writes of Mount Yoshino's cherry blossoms.  

Yoshino's cherry trees were planted in four groves at different altitudes, in part so they would come into bloom at different times of the spring. A 1714 account explained that, on their climb to the top, travelers would be able to enjoy the lower 1,000 cherry trees at the base, the middle 1,000 on the way, the upper 1,000 toward the top, and the 1,000 in the precincts of the inner shrine at the top.

Several important religious and pilgrimage destinations are located around Mount Yoshino, including Yoshino Mikumari Shrine, Kimpu Shrine and Kimpusen-ji. 

Famous products that can be found in shops in the area of Mount Yoshino include edible goods made from kudzu root and persimmon leaf-wrapped sushi (kakinoha-zushi).

Hiking 
Yoshinoyama has numerous hiking trails meandering through the town and the cherry blossom forests. A whole day can be spent hiking these trails and visiting all the different viewpoints. Multi-day hiking trails also connect to Koyasan and the town of Hongu in Wakayama prefecture.

Gallery

See also
Tourism in Japan

Notes

References
 Mostow, Joshua S., ed. (1996).  Pictures of the Heart: The Hyakunin Isshu in Word and Image. Honolulu: University of Hawaii Press. .

External links
 National Archives of Japan: Yoshinoyama syokeizu, guide to Mt. Yoshino in Yamato Province written by Kaibara Ekiken (1630–1714), published in 1714.
 Kabuki play:  Yoshitune Sembon Zakura (Yoshitsune and the Thousand Cherry Trees), Yoshinoyama (The Journey to Mt. Yoshino), Act 4, Scene 1 

Yoshino, Nara
Mountains of Nara Prefecture
Places of Scenic Beauty
World Heritage Sites in Japan
Historic Sites of Japan
Shinto in Japan
Hanami spots of Japan
Shinbutsu shūgō
Shugendō